The Ainu languages, sometimes known as Ainuic, are a small language family, often regarded as a language isolate, historically spoken by the Ainu people of northern Japan and neighboring islands.

The primary varieties of Ainu are alternately considered a group of closely related languages or divergent dialects of a single language isolate. The only surviving variety is Hokkaido Ainu, which UNESCO lists as critically endangered. Sakhalin Ainu and Kuril Ainu are now extinct. Toponymic evidence suggests Ainu was once spoken in northern Honshu and that much of the historically attested extent of the family was due to a relatively recent expansion northward. No genealogical relationship between Ainu and any other language family has been demonstrated, despite numerous attempts.

Varieties 
Recognition of the different varieties of Ainu spoken throughout northern Japan and its surrounding islands in academia varies. Refsing (1986) says Hokkaidō and Sakhalin Ainu were not mutually intelligible. (1964) considered Ainu data from 19 regions of Hokkaidō and Sakhalin, and found the primary division to lie between the two islands.

Kuril Ainu 
Data on Kuril Ainu is scarce, but it is thought to have been as divergent as Sakhalin and Hokkaidō.

Sakhalin Ainu
In Sakhalin Ainu, an eastern coastal dialect of Taraika (near modern Gastello (Poronaysk)) was quite divergent from the other localities. The Raychishka dialect, on the western coast near modern Uglegorsk, is the best documented and has a dedicated grammatical description. Take Asai, the last speaker of Sakhalin Ainu, died in 1994. The Sakhalin Ainu dialects had long vowels and a final -h phoneme, which was pronounced .

Hokkaidō Ainu 
Most texts and grammatical descriptions we have of Ainu cover the Central Hokkaidō dialect.

Classification 
 splits Ainu "dialects" as follows:

Proto-Ainu
Proto-Hokkaido–Kuril
Hokkaido dialects
Kuril dialects
Proto-Sakhalin
Sakhalin dialects

Protolang 
The protolang was reconstructed by Vovin (1993). The reconstruction shows the voiced stops except for [b] being distinct phonemes and uses /q/ for the glottal stop. He also proposes with this reconstruction, though doubtfully, that there might have been another fricative alongside [s] and [h], which was voiced, its place of articulation unknown. He represented it with /H/.

External relationships 
No genealogical relationship between Ainu and any other language family has been demonstrated, despite numerous attempts. Thus, it is a language isolate. Ainu is sometimes grouped with the Paleosiberian languages, but this is only a geographic blanket term for several unrelated language families that were present in Siberia before the advances of Turkic and Tungusic languages there.

The Ainu languages share a noteworthy amount of vocabulary (especially fish names) with several Northeast Asian languages, including Nivkh, Tungusic, Mongolic, and Chukotko-Kamchatkan. While linguistic evidence point to an origin of these words among the Ainu languages, its spread and how these words arrived into other languages will possibly remain a mystery.

The most frequent proposals for relatives of Ainu are given below:

Altaic 
John C. Street (1962) proposed linking Ainu, Korean, and Japanese in one family and Turkic, Mongolic, and Tungusic in another, with the two families linked in a common "North Asiatic" family. Street's grouping was an extension of the Altaic hypothesis, which at the time linked Turkic, Mongolic, and Tungusic, sometimes adding Korean; today Altaic sometimes includes Korean and rarely Japanese but not Ainu (Georg et al. 1999).

From a perspective more centered on Ainu, James Patrie (1982) adopted the same grouping, namely Ainu–Korean–Japanese and Turkic–Mongolic–Tungusic, with these two families linked in a common family, as in Street's "North Asiatic".

Joseph Greenberg (2000–2002) likewise classified Ainu with Korean and Japanese. He regarded "Korean–Japanese-Ainu" as forming a branch of his proposed Eurasiatic language family. Greenberg did not hold Korean–Japanese–Ainu to have an especially close relationship with Turkic–Mongolic–Tungusic within this family.

The Altaic hypothesis is now rejected by the scholarly mainstream.

Austroasiatic 
Shafer (1965) presented evidence suggesting a distant connection with the Austroasiatic languages, which include many of the indigenous languages of Southeast Asia.  presented his reconstruction of Proto-Ainu with evidence, in the form of proposed sound changes and cognates, of a relationship with Austroasiatic. In , he still regarded this hypothesis as preliminary.

Language contact with the Nivkhs 
The Ainu appear to have experienced intensive contact with the Nivkhs during the course of their history. It is not known to what extent this has affected the language. Linguists believe the vocabulary shared between Ainu and Nivkh (historically spoken in the northern half of Sakhalin and on the Asian mainland facing it) is due to borrowing.

Language contact with the Japanese 
The Ainu came into extensive contact with the Japanese in the 14th century. Analytic grammatical constructions acquired or transformed in Ainu were probably due to contact with the Japanese language. A large number of Japanese loanwords were borrowed into Ainu and to a smaller extent vice versa. Due to the low status of Ainu in Japan, many ancient loanwords may be ignored or undetected, but there is evidence of an older substrate, where older Japanese words which have no clear etymology appear related to Ainu words which do.

According to P. Elmer (2019), the Ainu languages are a contact language, i.e. have strong influences from various Japonic dialects/languages during different stages, suggesting early and intensive contact between them somewhere in the Tōhoku region, with Ainu borrowing a large amount of vocabulary and typological characteristics from early Japonic.

Other proposals 
A small number of linguists suggested a relation between Ainu and Indo-European languages, based on racial theories regarding the origin of the Ainu people. The theory of an Indo-European—Ainu relation was popular until 1960, later linguists dismissed it and did not follow the theory any more and concentrated on more local language families.

Tambotsev (2008) proposes that Ainu is typologically most similar to Native American languages and suggests that further research is needed to establish a genetic relationship between these languages.

Geography 
Until the 20th century, Ainu languages were spoken throughout the southern half of the island of Sakhalin and by small numbers of people in the Kuril Islands. Only the Hokkaido variant survives, with the last speaker of Sakhalin Ainu having died in 1994.

Some linguists noted that the Ainu language was an important lingua franca on Sakhalin.  (2005) reported that the status of the Ainu language was rather high and was also used by early Russian and Japanese administrative officials to communicate with each other and with the indigenous people.

Ainu on mainland Japan 

It is occasionally suggested that Ainu was the language of the indigenous  people of the northern part of the main Japanese island of Honshu. The main evidence for this is the presence of placenames that appear to be of Ainu origin in both locations. The traditional  hunters of the mountain forests of  retain Ainu words in their hunting vocabulary. However Japonic etymologies have also been suggested, which got borrowed into early Ainu and lost in contemporary Japonic dialects.

The direction of influence and migration is debated. It has been proposed that at least some Jōmon period groups spoke a proto-Ainu language, and that they displaced the Okhotsk culture north from southern Hokkaido when the Ainu fled Japanese expansion into northern Honshu, with the Okhotsk ancestral to the modern Nivkh as well as a component of the modern Ainu. However, it has also been proposed that the Ainu themselves can be identified with the Okhotsk culture, and that they expanded south into northern Honshu as well as to the Kamchatka Peninsula, or that the Emishi spoke a Japonic language, most closely related to ancient Izumo dialect, rather than anything related to Ainu, with Ainu-speakers migrating later from Hokkaido to northern Tōhoku. The purported evidence for this are old-Japanese loanwords in the Ainu language, including basic vocabulary, as well as distinctive Japonic terms and toponyms found in Tōhoku and Hokkaido, that have been linked to the Izumo dialect.

Notes

References

Bibliography 
 
 
 
 
 
 
 
 
 
 
 
 
 

Proposed classifications

Further reading 
  (Digitized by the University of Michigan December 8, 2006)
  (Digitized by Harvard University November 30, 2007) 
  (Harvard University) (Digitized October 8, 2008)
  (Harvard University) (Digitized October 8, 2008 )
  (Harvard University) (Digitized June 9, 2008)
  (Compiled by Mashiho Chiri) (University of Michigan) (Digitized August 15, 2006)
 Miyake, Marc. 2010. Is the itak an isolate?

See also 
 the Glossed Audio Corpus of Ainu Folklore
 List of Proto-Ainu reconstructions (Wiktionary)
 Ainu music
 
 
 Category:Ainu language (Wiktionary)
 Bibliography of the Ainu

External links 

 Literature and materials for learning Ainu
 The Book of Common Prayer in Ainu, translated by John Batchelor, digitized by Richard Mammana and Charles Wohlers
 Institute for the Study of Languages and Cultures of Ainu in Samani, Hokkaido
 A Grammar of the Ainu Language by John Batchelor
 An Ainu-English-Japanese Dictionary, including A Grammar of the Ainu Language by John Batchelor
 "The 'Greater Austric' hypothesis" by John Bengtson (undated)
 Ainu for Beginners by Kane Kumagai, translated by Yongdeok Cho
  Radio lessons on Ainu language presented by Sapporo TV
 A talking dictionary of Ainu: a new version of Kanazawa's Ainu conversational dictionary, with recordings of Mrs. Setsu Kurokawa

Ainu languages
Languages of Japan
Languages of Russia
Paleosiberian languages